Shah Alam Royal Mausoleum is a royal mausoleum of Selangor. The mausoleum is located near Sultan Salahuddin Abdul Aziz Shah Mosque in the state capital of Shah Alam, Malaysia.

List of graves

Royal family graves
 Raja Saidatul Ihsan binti Almarhum Raja Bendahara Tengku Badar Shah – Paduka Bonda Raja Selangor (died 31 May 2011)
 Lt. Col. Tunku Dato' Mokhtar Tunku Mohammad Jewa – brother of Gen. Tunku Tan Sri Osman Jewa from the Royal family of Kedah (died 2012)
 Tengku Putri Aishah binti Almarhum Sultan Salahuddin Abdul Aziz Shah (died 30 July 2012)
 Tunku Datin Sri Hajah Anita Abdiyah binti Tunku Dato Sri Adnan from the Royal family of Negeri Sembilan Tengku Puan Panglima Besar  (died 8 December 2012)
 Tengku Putri Sofiah binti Almarhum Sultan Salahuddin Abdul Aziz Shah (died 8 June 2017)
 To' Puan Pengiran Hajah Zaliha binti Pengiran Haji Tengah from the Royal family of Brunei (died 14 December 2022)

Leaders' graves
 Dato' Ishak Baharom – Selangor state Mufti (1985–1997) (died 2008)
 Tan Sri Abu Hassan Omar – 12th Menteri Besar of Selangor (1997–2000) (died 8 September 2018)
 Tun Arshad Ayub – Universiti Teknologi MARA Pro-Chancellor (died 14 June 2022)
 Tan Sri Abdul Khalid Ibrahim – 14th Menteri Besar of Selangor (2008–2014) (died 31 July 2022)

References

External links
 

Mausoleums in Selangor
Shah Alam